Magnesium hydride is the chemical compound with the molecular formula MgH2. It contains 7.66% by weight of hydrogen and has been studied as a potential hydrogen storage medium.

Preparation 
In 1951 preparation from the elements was first reported involving direct hydrogenation of Mg metal at high pressure and temperature (200 atmospheres, 500 °C) with MgI2 catalyst:
Mg + H2 → MgH2
Lower temperature production from Mg and H2 using nano crystalline Mg produced in ball mills has been investigated. Other preparations include:
 the hydrogenation of magnesium anthracene under mild conditions:
Mg(anthracene) + H2 → MgH2
 the reaction of diethylmagnesium with lithium aluminium hydride
 product of complexed MgH2 e.g. MgH2.THF by the reaction of phenylsilane and dibutyl magnesium in ether or hydrocarbon solvents in the presence of  THF or TMEDA as ligand.

Structure and bonding
The room temperature form α-MgH2 has a rutile structure. There are at least four high pressure forms: γ-MgH2 with α-PbO2 structure, cubic  β-MgH2 with Pa-3 space group, orthorhombic HP1 with Pbc21 space group and orthorhombic HP2 with Pnma space group. Additionally a non stoichiometric MgH(2-δ) has been characterised, but this appears to exist only for very small particles (bulk MgH2 is essentially stoichiometric, as it can only accommodate very low concentrations of H vacancies).

The bonding in the rutile form is sometimes described as being partially covalent in nature rather than purely ionic; charge density determination by synchrotron x-ray diffraction indicates that the magnesium atom is fully ionised and spherical in shape and the hydride ion is elongated.
Molecular forms of magnesium hydride, MgH, MgH2, Mg2H, Mg2H2, Mg2H3, and Mg2H4 molecules identified by their vibrational spectra  have been found in matrix isolated samples at below 10 K, formed following laser ablation of magnesium in the presence of hydrogen. The Mg2H4 molecule has a bridged structure analogous to dimeric aluminium hydride, Al2H6.

Reactions 
MgH2 readily reacts with water to form hydrogen gas:

MgH2 + 2 H2O → 2 H2 + Mg(OH)2

At 287 °C it decomposes to produce H2 at 1 bar pressure. The high temperature required is seen as a limitation in the use of MgH2 as a reversible hydrogen storage medium:

MgH2 → Mg + H2

References

Magnesium compounds
Metal hydrides